Elizabeth McQueen may refer to:

Elizabeth Lippincott McQueen (1878–1958),founder of the Women's International Association of Aeronautics
Elizabeth McQueen, vocalist with the western swing revival band Asleep at the Wheel